97 (ninety-seven) is the natural number following 96 and preceding 98. It is a prime number and the only prime in the nineties.

In mathematics
97 is:
 the 25th prime number (the largest two-digit prime number in base 10), following 89 and preceding 101.
 a Proth prime and a Pierpont prime as it is 3 × 25 + 1.
 the eleventh member of the Mian–Chowla sequence.
 a self number in base 10, since there is no integer that added to its own digits, adds up to 97.
 the smallest odd prime that is not a cluster prime.
 the highest two-digit number where the sum of its digits is a square.
 the number of primes <= 29.
 The numbers 97, 907, 9007, 90007 and 900007 are all primes, and they are all happy primes. However, 9000007 (read as nine million seven) is composite and has the factorisation 277 × 32491.
 an emirp
 an isolated prime, since 95 and 99 aren't prime.

In science
Ninety-seven is:
 The atomic number of berkelium, an actinide.

In astronomy
 Messier object M97, a magnitude 12.0 planetary nebula in the constellation Ursa Major, also known as the Owl Nebula
 The New General Catalogue object NGC 97, an elliptical galaxy in the constellation Andromeda

In other fields
Ninety-seven is:
 The 97th United States Congress met during the Ronald Reagan administration, from January 1981 to January 1983
 The 10-97 police code means "arrived on the scene"
 STS-97 Space Shuttle Endeavour mission launched November 30, 2000
 The 97th Infantry Division was a unit of the United States Army in World War I and World War II
 Madden NFL 97 was the first John Madden NFL American football game to be created in the 32-bit gaming era
 Radio stations broadcasting on frequencies near 97, such as Hot 97, New York City and 97X, Tampa, Florida
 The decimal unicode number representing the Latin lowercase "a"

In music
 A song "Baby Boy / Saturday Night '97" by Whigfield
 The number of the Southern Railway train in the Wreck of the Old 97, a ballad recorded by numerous artists, including Flatt and Scruggs, Woody Guthrie, Johnny Cash, Nine Pound Hammer, and Hank Snow.
 The Old 97's are an alt-country band, which took their name from the song "The Wreck of the Old ‘97".
 A song by Alkaline Trio off their self-titled album
 The Marching 97, marching band of Lehigh University.
 District 97, a progressive rock band from the Chicago area (named after the elementary school District 97 in Oak Park, Illinois).

See also
 List of Highways Numbered 97

References 

Integers